Caroline Vigneaux, (born 27 January 1975 in Nantes), is a French comedian.

Life 
Caroline Vigneaux was born on 27 January 1975 in Nantes. Her father is an engineer and her mother a speech therapist. After being sent by her parents to Catholic private schools, Caroline Vigneaux studied at Pantheon-Sorbonne University and obtained a law degree and a Master II Insurance and Civil Liability degree. She decided to take the entrance examination at the Law School to practice as a lawyer. In 2000, she obtained the Certificate of Proficiency in Law, took an oath and became a member of the Paris Bar. She joined the theater troupe of the Union of Young Lawyers in 2001, a troupe writing sketches about the life of the Paris Bar.

In 2001, the Granrut business firm hired her as a collaborating lawyer; she stayed there four years.

In 2004, Vigneaux was elected 11th secretary of the conference of the internship at the end of the contest of eloquence of the Conference of the Bar of Paris.

In 2005, she joined the American firm Dewey & LeBoeuf and stayed there for two years.

In 2006, she was one of the lawyers at the end of the debates on the show L'Arène de France, on France 2.

In 2008, she submitted her resignation to the partners of the firm Dewey & LeBoeuf.

In 2008, she enrolled at the Cours Florent drama school and in 2009 started as a humourist with her one-woman show, playing a "crazy" fairy who has taken possession of Vigneaux's body.

In 2010, while on tour for her second show, Vigneaux announced at the Festival d'Avignon that she was leaving her law career behind.

In 2011, Stéphane Bern hired her as a columnist for RTL's "À la bonne heure", in which she made guest portraits and wrote about the judicial system in a humorous tone.

She participated in "Only Wanted to laugh" with Laurent Ruquier on France 2, performing three sketches on 15 February 21 February, and 12 December 2011.

In 2013, Anne Roumanoff offered her a role in her television series "C'est la crise !," broadcast on Comédie+. She played Isla Hildeu in the television series  broadcast on Orange Cinema Series. She also played in the series "La Télé commande" with Elie Semoun, broadcast on the program "So Far All Right."

Filmography 

 2013 : C'est la crise : Sidonie
 2013 – 2014 : Lazy Company : Isla Hildeu
 2014 : L'esprit de famille (téléfilm) : ophthalmologist.
 2015 : On voulait tout casser Anne-Marie.
 2016 : À fond, de Nicolas Benamou : Julia.
 2021 : Flashback as Charlie Leroy (also director)

References

External links

Living people
1975 births
French actresses
21st-century French lawyers
Cours Florent alumni
21st-century French women